Pandit Bhikari Charan Bal (Bhikāri Charaṇa Baḷa; 1929-2010), better known as Bhajan Samrat to the people of Odisha, was an Odissi music guru and singer, best known for his renditions of traditional Odia bhajanas, devotional songs addressed to the deity Jagannatha.

Early life
Bhikari Bal was born in Sobala Village Under Gogua, Gangapada Kendrapara Block/district in the state of Odisha, India. His parents, Ramachandra Bal and Gellharani Devi, died when he was very young. After the death of his first wife, his father Ramachandra had married Gellharani, Bhikari's mother. Ramachandra's first wife had given birth to a son, Dhaneswara, who was much older than Bhikari. Gellharani gave birth to several children but none of them survived. So they named their surviving only son "Bhikari" - the beggar.  Out of superstition, the parents pretended to have sold the baby to an untouchable family from whom they bought their  child back. The child survived but the parents died not long after, so the care of the child Bhikari fell on his step-brother Dhaneswar and his wife.

After primary education, Bhikari enrolled in Gogua High School in Kendrapada district and studied up to ninth grade.  His village, Sobala, had a Jatra party and young Bhikari joined it.  Through the Jatra party, he  learned to sing and act and play harmonium. In those days, boys used to dance as girls in Jatra parties. They were called Gotipua.  Later, Bhikari Bal became a music teacher in a local school, Gokulachandra Sangeeta Sadan.  He married at the age of 20. For a young man with any talent in any village, Cuttack town was a natural attraction, so he went there to find greener pasture.

Career
Bhikari Bala took the job of an Odissi vocalist at the Kalabikash Kendra, Cuttack. In early 1960s, Bhikari Bal was a struggling artist. Because of his connection to the Kalabikash Kendra, he came to the attention of Kalicharan Pattanayak, the patron saint of anything Odissi and also a well established singer Balakrushna Das. His voice was refined under the tutelage of Odissi maestro Balakrushna Das. This was the period of struggle for him with the late singer constantly trying for a break in All India Radio, Cuttack. He became an A-grade singer there in 1963 after he received rave reviews for his first broadcast song Prana mitani bareh chahan re. But his popularity grew with Kotha bhoga khia, Sathie pauthi bhogaru tumara and other such devotional songs in the early 1970s. His lucid and moving rendition of bhajans written by old generation poets such as Gopalakrushna, Dinakrushna, Baldev, Banamali and Salabega are still popular today. He had also rendered songs by Dr. Prasanna Samal, Arabinda Muduli, Radhanath Das, Raghunath Rout, Khirod Chandra Pothal, Sirsananda Kanungo, Alekh Biswal, Gourhari Dalei and Srikant Gautam. His Jagannath bhajans and Gita Govinda recitals made him a household name. He had also sung Champu, Chhanda, folk songs and devotional songs in Odia movies. He was awarded the title of Bhajan Samrat by the Puri Gajapati and was given special privileges inside the temple for his devotional tribute to Lord Jagannath. He was also taken to be one of the servitors of the temple for having offered the Chaamara Seba to Lord Jagannath. He also gave his voice as playback singer in a number of Odia films including Bhakta Salabega, Agni Pariksha, Mathura Bijaya, Abhilasha, Amar Prem, Kie Kahara and Srikrushna Rasa Leela, etc..

Discography 

The following songs have been sung by Bhiakri Bal, but the year of their release is unknown, since these mainly played over radio between 1970 and 2000. Although the list is comprehensive yet it's not exhaustive.
 Athara Dinara Mahabharata
 Ana Ana Re Mita
 Aakhi Kholi Dekhuthile Disu Asundara
 Aadei Jaao
 Aahe Chakaakhi
 Aahe Nilagiri
 Aahe Nilasaila
 Aahe Prabhu Kala Srimukha
 Bada Thakura He
 Badadeulare Neta Ude Phara Phara
 Baliaa Tu Saakhi Rahitha
 Babu Re Prabhu Nama Kebe Tu Dharibu
 Bhakata Bidura
 Bhakti Achi Mora Puja Nahin
 Bhabaku Nikata Abhaabaku Dura
 Bhuja Tale Mote Rakha
 Chanhi Chanhi Dina Gala
 Daasiaa Nadia
 Daasia Baauri Karide Kaaliaa
 Dinabandhu Ehi Ali Srichhamure
 Dinabandhu Daitaari
 Dukha Nasono He
 De Re Kaaliaa De To Paade Sarana De
 Dekha Re Dekha
 Dayakara Dinabandhu
 Emiti E Badadaande
 Garuda Pakhi
 Hatiaa Thakura
 Haatare Mo Mutha Mutha
 Himalaya Ru Kanyakumari
 Jagabandhu He Gosaayin
 Jagabandhu Pari Jane Saamanta
 Jagannatha He Etiki Karuchi Ali
 Jagannatha Kale Ja Anaatha
 Jagannatha Kichi Maagu Nahin Tote
 Jagannatha Tume Jadi Lakshmi Huanta
 Jaga kalia Re
 Jaga kalia Dakuchi Bhuja Melei
 Jaga kalia Paade Sarana
 Jalu thiba Maha
dipa Baju thiba Sankha
 Jibanare Jibi Brundabana
 Jaya Jaya Jagannatha
 Kalia Ra Dori Bhari Sakata
 Kalia Saante Ho
 Kete Janamara Dukha Pare Prabhu
 Kehi Rahi Nahi Rahibe Nahi
 Kotho Bhoga Khia
 Mahabahu Jaha Tuma ichha Taha Heu
 Mana Para Re
 Mana Harinama Ganthidhana
 Manabodha Chautisha
 Micchha Duniaare Gotie Sata
 Micchhe Sina Mali Daaki Daaki
 Mu Ta Badadeulara Para
 Mora Jedina Jaliba Juui
 Na Galu Mana Khetrasthala Ku
 Nandanandana Sundara Chhitachora
 Nilachakre Ho
 Patitapaabana Baanaa Aau Kete Belaku
 Paani Jaauthila Hali Hali
 Sabhien Kahanti Badadaanda Bada
 Sakhi Lo Thare Pachaari Bujha
 Sate Ki E Jiiba Jiba
 Saante Pheribe Deulaku Aaji
 Shyama He Shyama He
 Sathiye Pauti
 Tume Para Badathakura
 Tote Kemiti Daakibi Kaalia
 Thaka Mana Chala Jiba

Final years and death
The singer was bed-ridden for about a year due to age related ailments and had been admitted to the SCB Medical College and Hospital in Cuttack. After the public outrage, the Govt. of Odisha offered financial assistance to the legend and urged the state health department to take care of his health. On 2 November 2010, he died at the SCB Medical College and Hospital at around 11:20 pm. Later, he was consigned to flames at the Swargadwara at Puri. His elder son Ashok Bal performed the last rites. A guard of honour by according gun salute was presented at the crematorium while the Sri Jagannath Temple administration presented a sacred piece of cloth (khandua) to cover his body.

References
 https://web.archive.org/web/20121102114225/http://www.telegraphindia.com/1101104/jsp/orissa/story_13135905.jsp
 https://web.archive.org/web/20101116053120/http://www.hindu.com/2010/07/01/stories/2010070152290200.htm
 
 https://web.archive.org/web/20110227175650/http://shrijagannath.info/?p=278
 http://www.indiatvnews.com/news/India/Oriya_Devotional_Singer_Bhikari_Bal_Dead-5225.html
 
 http://www.dnaindia.com/india/report_orissa-government-to-bat-for-padma-award-for-bhajan-samrat-bhikari-bal_1414314
 

Ollywood
People from Kendrapara district
People from Cuttack
Cinema of Odisha
1929 births
2010 deaths
20th-century Indian musicians
20th-century Indian male singers
20th-century Indian singers
Odissi music
Recipients of the Odisha Sangeet Natak Akademi award